MilkyTracker is a free software multi-platform music tracker for composing music in the MOD and XM module file formats.

It is a clone that attempts to recreate the module replay and user experience of the popular DOS program FastTracker 2, with special playback modes available for improved Amiga Protracker 2/3 compatibility.

Module tracking
Module composition or "tracking" is done through the control of multichannel sample playback. An instrument is created by arranging one or more audio samples across a keyboard range. The instrument is then sequenced on a monophonic track that contains note, volume and effect data.  A pattern is a series of tracks that are played back simultaneously. A song is then created by arranging the patterns.

Features
MilkyTracker is able to open several legacy music module formats and is able to save in .xm and .mod formats.

Like FastTracker, MilkyTracker contains a sample editor and an instrument editor. The envelope editor of the instrument editor allows the creation of many envelope points and user definable envelope loop points.

MilkyTracker also supports basic (velocity sensitive) note input via MIDI.

Platform support
MilkyTracker supports several operating systems and hardware platforms. These include:

 Microsoft Windows: MilkyTracker runs on Windows 9x , Me, NT, Windows 200x, XP, Vista , 7, 8, 8.1, 10, and 11
 Unix-like: MilkyTracker is available for Linux, Android, macOS, OpenBSD, and FreeBSD.
 Amiga: A port of MilkyTracker exists for AmigaOS, MorphOS and AROS.
 Windows Mobile: MilkyTracker can be run on Windows Mobile smartphones, PDAs, Pocket PC and a VDO Dayton car navigation system running Windows CE 4.2.
 Android
 Xbox
 GP2x

History
MilkyTracker is not based on any existing module replay engine. Its core, MilkyPlay, has been in development since the mid-90s, originally as a Digitrakker .MDL player. MilkyTracker development started a decade later for the Pocket PC and it still fully operates on rather humble PDAs. MilkyTracker is and will stay a 2nd generation tracker. There are no plans to add modern tracker features that would break compatibility with FastTracker.

See also 
:Category:Audio trackers

References

External links
 
 

Cross-platform free software
Free music software
Software using the GPL license
Audio trackers
Demoscene software
Audio software with JACK support
AmigaOS 4 software